Prince 'Abdul Muntaqim (born 17 March 2007) is the oldest child and first son of Al-Muhtadee Billah, heir to the Sultan of Brunei, and his wife, Sarah, Crown Princess of Brunei. He has a younger sister, Princess Muneerah Madhul, who was born in 2011. The Prince is second-in-line to become Sultan of Brunei after his father Al-Muhtadee Billah. His father is heir to Abdul Muntaqim's grandfather Sultan Haji Hassanal Bolkiah of Brunei.

Biography 
Prince Muntaqim is born on 17 March 2007, at the Raja Isteri Pengiran Anak Saleha Hospital in Bandar Seri Begawan. In honour of the birth of the prince, a 19-gun salute was fired from the cannons on the grounds of Istana Nurul Iman, the official residence of the Sultan of Brunei. He is currently studying in the International School Brunei (ISB).

Personal interests 
During the 5th Brunei Open & Masters Swimming Championship at the Hassanal Bolkiah National Sports Complex, he made two new records which were 1:33.05 in 100 m freestyle and 51.12s in 50 m backstroke.

Abdul Muntaqim participated in several basketball tournaments representing ISB including the U-13 Omni 3×3 Challenge, and the U-13 Brunei Youth Cup.

He captained for Brunei national U-17 football team during the 2022 AFF U-16 Championship in Indonesia. He and his team DPMM FC played in the U-15 Brunei Youth League in 2021.

Consequently losing to Dessen Chung Min Ting in the Brunei Open Badminton Championship 2018, he made as far as into the semi-final.

For the 2019 under-13 Federation of British International Schools in Asia (FOBISIA) Games, Abdul Muntaqim was part of the athletics team sent to represent ISB in Phuket, Thailand.

Honours 
 Sultan of Brunei Golden Jubilee Medal – (5 October 2017)

Ancestry

References

|-

2007 births
Living people
Royal children
Bruneian royalty
Bruneian people of Swiss descent